Kazakhstan–Netherlands relations refer to the bilateral relations between Kazakhstan and the Netherlands. The Netherlands has an embassy in Astana. Kazakhstan has an embassy in The Hague.



History

Economic relations 
There is significant trade between the two countries in agriculture, oil, chemicals and machinery sectors.

The Netherlands is the largest source of foreign direct investment into Kazakhstan. $90.4 billion of foreign direct investment was directed from the Netherlands to Kazakhstan from 1991 till 2019. Dutch companies invested $7.3 billion into the economy of Kazakhstan in 2019 accounting for 30.2% of total FDI that year and remaining the biggest investors in the Central Asian country.

A bilateral investment treaty signed in 2002 establishes a framework for fair and equitable treatment of respective investments and capital so to encourage foreign direct investment and trade.

State visits 

In 2015, Dutch Prime Minister Mark Rutte met with Nursultan Nazarbayev in Astana, Kazakhstan and affirmed the Enhanced Partnership and Cooperation Agreement between the European Union and Kazakhstan.

See also 
 Foreign relations of Kazakhstan 
 Foreign relations of the Netherlands
 Kazakhstan–EU relations

References 

 
Netherlands
Bilateral relations of the Netherlands